Paul Dangshu is an indian politician from Tripura, India. He won the 2023 Tripura Legislative Assembly election as a candidate of Tipra Motha Party and became member of the Tripura Legislative Assembly from the Karamchera assembly constituency.

References 

Living people
Tripura MLAs 2023–2028
Year of birth missing (living people)